The 2015 Constellation Cup was the 6th Constellation Cup series played between Australia and New Zealand. The series, also known as the New World Netball Series, featured four netball test matches, played in October 2015. The Australia team was coached by Lisa Alexander and captained by Laura Geitz. New Zealand were coached by Waimarama Taumaunu and captained by Casey Kopua. Australia won the first two tests and led 2–0 going into the third test. However, New Zealand won the third and fourth tests to level the series at 2–2. Australia were declared the winners because, having scored 202 goals compared to New Zealand's 200, they had a better aggregate score over the series.

Squads

Australia

Debuts
 Gabi Simpson made her senior debut for Australia in the first test on 20 October 2015.
 Gretel Tippett made her senior debut for Australia in the second test on 22 October 2015.
 On 25 October 2015, Ashleigh Brazill and Jo Weston both made their senior debuts for Australia in the third test.

Milestones
 On 22 October 2015, during the second test, for the first time in the history of the Australia national netball team, five Queensland Firebirds players were on the court at the same time. The five were Laura Geitz, Clare McMeniman, Gretel Tippett, Kim Ravaillion and Gabi Simpson.
 On 30 October 2015, during the fourth test, Caitlin Bassett scored her 1500th international goal in the opening quarter.

New Zealand

Milestones
 On 25 October 2015, Casey Kopua made her 100th test appearance during the third test.

Matches

New World Netball Series

First test

Second test

Third test

Fourth test

References

2015
2015 in New Zealand netball
2015 in Australian netball
October 2015 sports events in New Zealand
October 2015 sports events in Australia